Itkulovo (Etqol) is a rural locality (a village) in Abzanovsky Selsoviet, Zianchurinsky District, Bashkortostan, Russia. The population was 383 as of 2010. There are 6 streets.

Geography 
Itkulovo is located 52 km southeast of Isyangulovo (the district's administrative centre) by road. Abzanovo is the nearest rural locality.

References 

Rural localities in Zianchurinsky District